Mario Wickus Olivier (born 3 November 1982 in Pretoria) is a South African cricketer who played first-class cricket from 2005 to 2012.

In December 2007 he became the third South African to take 10 wickets in a first-class innings when he took 10 for 65 for Warriors against Eagles. Eagles nevertheless won by 10 wickets, so Olivier took all their wickets that fell in the match. Five of his victims were out leg before wicket.

References

External links 

1982 births
Living people
Cricketers from Pretoria
South African cricketers
Boland cricketers
Warriors cricketers
Border cricketers
Cricketers who have taken ten wickets in an innings